William L. Graul (July 27, 1846 – September 2, 1909) was a Union Army soldier in the American Civil War who received the U.S. military's highest decoration, the Medal of Honor.

Graul was born in Reading, Pennsylvania, where he later entered service. Aged 18, he was awarded the Medal of Honor, for extraordinary heroism shown at Fort Harrison during the Battle of Chaffin's Farm, for placing the American flag on the Confederate Army fortifications, while serving as a corporal with Company I, 188th Pennsylvania Infantry. The flag of Graul's company, the 188th Pennsylvania Infantry, was carried by Cecil Clay, for which he also won the Medal of Honor.

His Medal of Honor was issued on April 6, 1865.

Graul later had five children after his military service.

Medal of Honor citation

References

External links

1846 births
1909 deaths
American Civil War recipients of the Medal of Honor
Burials at Charles Evans Cemetery
People from Reading, Pennsylvania
Union Army officers
United States Army Medal of Honor recipients
People of Pennsylvania in the American Civil War